Loureedia annulipes is a species of spider in the velvet spider family Eresidae, found in Algeria, Tunisia, Libya, Egypt and Israel.

References

Eresidae
Spiders of North Africa
Spiders of Western Asia
Spiders described in 1857